Alan C McLaughlin (also known as Alan McLaughlin) is a Scottish Director of Photography. He is perhaps best known for his work on the film Lost Serenity which earned him the Best Director of Photography accolade at the 2013 British Academy Scotland New Talent Awards.

Filmography

Awards and nominations

References

External links
Falkirk Herald Article on McLaughlin
Timelock Movie Cast & Crew 
Ink Teaser Trailer
Article by McLaughlin on Scottish Cinematography Group
Camerimage Debut Cinematography Competition

Scottish cinematographers
Year of birth missing (living people)
Living people
British Academy Scotland New Talent Award Winners